The Classic Roy Orbison is the ninth studio album recorded by Roy Orbison, and his third on the MGM Records label, released in July 1966. The single taken from it, "Twinkle Toes", would be Orbison's last US top-forty single during his lifetime, scraping in at #39. It also reached #24 in Australia and #29 in the UK.

History
Some of the songs were leftovers from The Orbison Way sessions.

Track listing
The album reached No. 12 in the UK. All tracks composed by Roy Orbison and Bill Dees, except where indicated.

Produced by Wesley Rose & Jim Vienneau
Engineered by Val Valentin

Roy Orbison albums
1966 albums
Albums produced by Wesley Rose
MGM Records albums